Griveaudia nigropuncta is a species of moth of the family Callidulidae. It was described by Pierre Viette in 1958 and is found in Madagascar.

Taxonomy
The name nigropuncta is preoccupied by Griveaudia nigropuncta described by John Leech in 1898.

References

Callidulidae
Moths of Madagascar
Moths of Africa
Moths described in 1958